Altynkol Railway Station is located in Khorgas, Panfilov District, Almaty Region, Kazakhstan, the border of China and Kazakhstan, a spur line railway station of Kazakhstan Temir Zholy. 

The Chinese standard gauge is different from the Kazak broad gauge, which means that a break-of-gauge is required in this station.

See also 
 Turkestan–Siberia Railway
 Huo'erguosi Railway Station
 Jinghe–Yining–Khorgos railway

References

External links 
Altynkol Railway Station

Railway stations in Almaty Region
Railway stations opened in 2012
Almaty Region